Coleophora adspersella is a moth of the family Coleophoridae. It is found in most of Europe, except the Iberian Peninsula, Switzerland and Slovenia. It is also found in China. It occurs in forest and forest steppe biotopes, and in anthropogenic landscapes where the food plant occurs.

Coleophora species have narrow blunt to pointed forewings and a weakly defined tornus. The hindwings are narrow-elongate and very long-fringed. The upper surfaces have neither a discal spot nor transverse lines. Each abdomen segment of the abdomen has paired patches of tiny spines which show through the scales. The resting position is horizontal with the front end raised and the cilia give the hind tip a frayed and upturned look if the wings are rolled around the body. Adults have pale forewings with darker specks arranged between the veins, giving a faint striated appearance.

They are on wing from June to August.

The larvae feed on Atriplex and Chenopodium species. They feed on the seeds and later form a ribbed case in which they hibernate.

References

External links

 Bestimmungshilfe für die in Europa nachgewiesenen Schmetterlingsarten

adspersella
Moths described in 1939
Moths of Asia
Moths of Europe